Aasmah Saira Mir (born 7 October 1971) is a Scottish television and radio broadcaster and journalist who currently copresents the Monday-Thursday breakfast show on Times Radio.

Early life
Mir was born to first-generation Pakistani immigrants in Glasgow and brought up in the affluent suburb of Bearsden from the age of ten, where she attended Bearsden Academy. She graduated from the University of Bristol with an honours law degree in 1993.

Journalism
In 1995 Mir had a brief stint as a reporter for the Daily Record and Sunday Mail, then became a radio researcher. In 2005 and 2006 she was a columnist for the Sunday Herald.

Broadcasting career

Television
Mir, whose sister Uzma was already working for BBC Scotland, first appeared in an episode of a 1992 BBC Scotland show called The Insiders presented by Gordon Kennedy. After graduation she joined Scottish Television aged 21 as a trainee and read the early morning news bulletins and later presented the main news show.

She presented a couple of editions of an Asian documentary strand for BBC Two called East in 1996 and some items on Desi DNA. In 1998 she became a reporter for Central Television in Nottingham.

Mir also presented episodes Just Write on Channel 4 and Around Scotland on BBC Two. In 2010 she was a newspaper reviewer on GMTV with Lorraine and Lorraine.

Radio
In 1999 Mir moved to London as a producer for BBC Radio London and started doing freelance news-reading shifts for the national radio station BBC Radio 5 Live. She joined the station full-time in July 2001.

In April 2006 she covered the weekday morning phone-in programme on BBC Asian Network for a fortnight between Sonia Deol leaving and Anita Rani becoming presenter. She has presented items on the BBC Asian Network Report.

Mir presented the Midday News on 5 Live, Monday to Friday, until 9 January 2009. In 2009 she presented some Friday editions of Good Morning Scotland. Also in 2009 she presented a series of programmes for BBC Radio 4 on Scotland's Year of Homecoming, as well as Colour Me White for Radio 4, and Gay Life After Saddam for Radio 5 Live. In 2010 she replaced Anita Anand as a presenter of Radio 5 Live's Drive programme. For one week in March 2012 she sat in for Jeremy Vine on his BBC Radio 2 programme.

On 27 September 2012 Mir announced on Twitter that she planned to leave BBC 5 Live after 11 years with the station. Mir presented her last 5 Live Drive on 9 November 2012. On 29 October 2012 Mir presented an edition of BBC Radio 4's Woman's Hour and for a while replaced Julia Hartley-Brewer on the LBC 97.3 afternoon programme.

From 2012 to 2020 she was a copresenter of BBC Radio 4's Saturday Live.

In April 2020 she was announced as a presenter for Times Radio when the station launched on 29 June 2020. She copresents Monday to Thursday breakfast with Stig Abell.

Personal life
Mir is an avid fan of Celtic F.C.

She was married to Piara Powar, the executive director of Football Against Racism in Europe. She gave birth to a daughter at the age of 44. In 2021 Mir divorced Powar, stating that "this was my decision so I cannot wallow for too long".

References

External sources
Aasmah Mir Sunday Herald, 7 August 2005
Asian Network Reports Special BBC Asian Network – Documentary presented by Mir on Asian Network Report

1971 births
Living people
Mass media people from Glasgow
BBC newsreaders and journalists
BBC Radio 5 Live presenters
BBC Asian Network presenters
Alumni of the University of Bristol
Scottish people of Indian descent
Scottish people of Kashmiri descent